An election was held on November 8, 2016 to elect all 41 members to Texas' House of Representatives. The election coincided with the elections for other offices, including U.S. President, U.S. House of Representatives and state senate. The primary election was held on March 1, 2016 with a run-off on May 24, 2016.

Republicans retained control of the House despite losing four seats, winning 95 seats compared to 55 seats for the Democrats.

As of 2020, this is the last time Republicans won a state house seat in Travis, Hays, or Blanco counties.

Results

Statewide

Close Races
Seats where the margin of victory was under 10%:

District
Results of the 2016 Texas House of Representatives election by district:

References

House of Representatives
2016
Texas House of Representatives